Pouteria bonneriana is a species of plant in the family Sapotaceae. It is endemic to Peru.

References

Flora of Peru
bonneriana
Vulnerable plants
Taxonomy articles created by Polbot